Sir John Stuart Knill, 2nd Baronet (4 September 1856 – 26 March 1934) was Lord Mayor of London for 1909 to 1910.

He was the son of Sir Stuart Knill, 1st Baronet, the first Roman Catholic Lord Mayor of London since the Reformation.

Knill was an Alderman Alderman in London. He was Master of the Worshipful Company of Plumbers in 1902.

See also 
 Knill baronets

References 
 https://www.ukwhoswho.com/view/10.1093/ww/9780199540891.001.0001/ww-9780199540884-e-212441

1856 births
1934 deaths
Baronets in the Baronetage of the United Kingdom
20th-century lord mayors of London